The Argon was made by Grannaway Engineering Co, Earls Court, London S.W. in 1908. It was a fairly large touring car using a 25 hp 6-cylinder Coventry-Simplex engine. It was priced at 750 pounds. In 1905, the company was said to be planning a car deemed the Grannaway, but it is not clear whether this ever came to fruition.

See also
 List of car manufacturers of the United Kingdom

Vintage vehicles

Defunct motor vehicle manufacturers of England
Motor vehicle manufacturers based in London